Anseong is a city in Gyeonggi Province, South Korea,  south of Seoul.

Anseong promotes itself as "The City of Masters". It is known for producing brassware and arts and crafts. From late spring to fall, Anseong holds its own Namsadang Neuri Festival. The agriculture of Anseong consists of Asian pears, grapes, ginseng, and rice.

It borders Pyeongtaek-si to the west, Yongin-si to the north, Icheon-si and Eumseong-gun to the east, and Cheonan-si, Chungcheongnam-do and Jincheon-gun, Chungcheongbuk-do to the south. It is located in the southernmost part of Gyeonggi-do and is adjacent to Chungcheong-do along with Pyeongtaek-si, so it serves as a kind of gateway.

Modern history 
In 1963, Gosam town of Yongin was incorporateded by Anseong. At that time, Anseong was a county.
In 1983, 6 towns ceded by Anseong and attached as a district of Pyeongtaek.
In 1998, Anseong county became Anseong city.

A city located in the southernmost part of central and southern Gyeonggi-do. It borders Pyeongtaek-si to the west, Yongin-si to the north, Icheon-si and Eumseong-gun to the east, and Cheonan-si, Chungcheongnam-do and Jincheon-gun, Chungcheongbuk-do to the south. It is located in the southernmost part of Gyeonggi-do and is adjacent to Chungcheong-do along with Pyeongtaek-si, so it serves as a kind of gateway. For this reason, in the past, it was counted as one of the three major commercial cities along with Daegu and Jeonju. At that time, Anseong was a bustling city that was not envious of a large city. Especially, the 5-day market held on the 2nd and 7th of every month was one of the three largest markets in Joseon.

Population 
 Anseong-si CI Anseong-si, Gyeonggi-do Population Trend
 (1966~present)
 144,274 in 1966
 133,404 people in 1970
 132,888 in 1975
 1980 127,891
 1983 Yong-ri, Jukbaek-ri, Cheongyong-ri, Wolgok-ri, Wongok-myeon, Sosa-ri, Gongdo-myeon → transferred to Pyeongtaek-eup, Pyeongtaek-gun↘
 1985 121,752 people
 118,260 in 1990
 1995 124,671
 1998 Anseong-gun → Promoted to Anseong-si
 136,590 in 2000
 157,130 in 2005
 177,937 in 2010
 180,199 in 2015
 187,012 people in 2020
 September 2022 189,648 people
The population is based on the administrative district for the year, not the current administrative district, and the maximum value in the graph is 300,000 people.
1966-1990: National Statistical Office Census, 1995-Present: Resident Registration Population Statistics of Ministry of Public Administration and Security

Education 
Institutions of higher learning in Anseong include:
Ansung Women's Polytechnic College
Capital Baptist Theological Seminary
Chung-Ang University (Anseong campus)
Dong-Ah Broadcasting College
Doowon Technical College
Hankyong National University

Hangyeore Middle and High School, a special school for North Korean refugees, is in Anseong.

Geography
Land area by type and usage:

Climate
Anseong has a humid continental climate (Köppen: Dwa), but can be considered a borderline humid subtropical climate (Köppen: Cwa) using the  isotherm.

Administrative districts 

The city is divided into one eup (town) and 11 myeon (townships) and three dong (neighborhoods):

Sister Cities 

  Jongno District, Seoul
  Nashua, New Hampshire, United States

Notable people from Anseong
Hong Sa-ik, Zainichi Korean war criminal and lieutenant general of the Imperial Japanese Army
Pak Tu-jin, South Korean poet
Cho Byung-hwa, South Korean poet, critic and essayist
Kim Soo-ro, South Korean actor
Andrew Yeom Soo-jung, South Korean cardinal of the Catholic Church and the Korean Roman Catholic Archbishop of Seoul

Gallery

See also 

 List of cities in South Korea
 Geography of South Korea

References

External links 

City government website 

 
Cities in Gyeonggi Province
음성 우미린 풀하우스